Alma Denenholz Kaplan (1906 – 1 March 2003) was an American poet and syndicated columnist who wrote under the pseudonym Alma Denny.

Life and career
Denny was born Alma Denenholz in Far Rockaway in New York City, the eldest of ten children.  She received degrees from Hunter College and Teachers College, Columbia University and married a doctor, Theodore Kaplan, with whom she had two children.

Though her husband was adamant that she not work, Denny pursued a career as a freelance writer.  Her light verse and vignettes appeared in Good Housekeeping, The New Yorker, Light Quarterly, The New York Times, Reader's Digest, English Today, Playboy, The Wall Street Journal, The Lyric, and other popular magazines.  Her poetry was widely anthologized, appearing in The Random House Treasury of Light Verse and other collections, and she was the featured poet in the Winter 1998 issue of Light Quarterly.  Her first book of poetry, Blinkies: Funny Poems to Read in a Blink, was published in 1991 and was reviewed favourably by columnist Richard Lederer.

Denny was also a syndicated columnist, penning the weekly advice column "Family Council" which appeared in 40 newspapers in the 1960s.  She was later a frequent contributor to The New York Times.

Denny died in her Manhattan home in March 2003, aged 96.

Denny's great-niece is the writer Dawn Eden Goldstein.

Bibliography

Books
Blinkies: Funny Poems to Read in a Blink by Alma Denny (Lamb & Lion Studio, 1991)

In anthologies
The Random House Treasury of Light Verse by Louis Phillips, editor
Light Year '87 by Robert Wallace, editor (Bits Press, 1986)

References

External links
Alma Mattered: My Great-Aunt's Lessons for Literary Survival by Dawn Eden

1906 births
2003 deaths
American advice columnists
American women columnists
20th-century American poets
Writers from Queens, New York
Pseudonymous women writers
The New York Times writers
People from Far Rockaway, Queens
American women poets
Hunter College alumni
Teachers College, Columbia University alumni
20th-century American women writers
Poets from New York (state)
Jewish American poets
American women non-fiction writers
20th-century American non-fiction writers
20th-century pseudonymous writers
20th-century American Jews
21st-century American Jews
21st-century American women